Günther Benecke (10 May 1923 – 8 January 1980) was a German sailor. He competed in the Dragon event at the 1960 Summer Olympics.

References

External links
 

1923 births
1980 deaths
German male sailors (sport)
Olympic sailors of the United Team of Germany
Sailors at the 1960 Summer Olympics – Dragon
Sportspeople from Hamburg